Nannerch is a village and community in Flintshire, Wales, located within the Clwydian Range and Dee Valley Area of Outstanding Natural Beauty. At the 2001 Census the population of Nannerch was 531, reducing to 496 in 2011.

History
Nannerch (pronounced Nan-er-ch Welsh) is one of the ancient parishes of Flintshire, made up of the townships of Trellan, Trefechan, Trecwm and Tre Penbedw.

It is an ancient village, sitting on bedrock of Carboniferous Limestone, overlain by glacial boulder clay with glacial hollows. The limestone has been used in the construction of many local buildings. The ruins of Iron Age hill forts at Pen-y-Cloddiau and Moel Arthur are situated in the nearby hills.

The Church

The church, which is dedicated to St. Michael and All Angels, was consecrated on 29 September 1853. It is the third church known to have been built on the site. The curved wall of the graveyard indicates the ancient origins of the churches. The present church was designed by Thomas W. Wyatt, of London, the architect of the neighbouring churches of Brynford and Gorsedd. Services open to everyone are held in the church at 9.30 am each Sunday. 'Fifth Sunday' services rotate around churches in the Bro Famau group of churches of which St. Michael's church is a member.

Nannerch has no shops  but has an 18th-century inn called The Cross Foxes.

The village also has a primary school. There are currently around 60 pupils enrolled. On the same site as the Victorian primary school is a small sports development consisting of a tennis court which doubles as a basketball/netball court and five-a-side football pitch, a grass football pitch and a bowling green. The bowling green also has a French-style boules piste next to it.

Nannerch is sometimes visited by a doctor at the village hall on Tuesday morning. On Thursday there is a Post Office counter in the hall.

Theatre
The village has a dramatic group called the Nannerch Players. The Players perform two shows a year; one of these will be a pantomime, performed just before Christmas. One full-length play performed in the summer months (usually May–June) and give out the golden lemon award to a great performance which this year was given to Carys Grieve.

Transport
The main A541 Mold - Denbigh road bypasses the village.

The Mold and Denbigh Junction Railway, which opened in 1869, passed through the village. Nannerch railway station was situated near the point where the road into Nannerch forks left to leave the A541 road from Mold. After the line was closed in 1962, a victim of the Beeching Axe, the station was converted to a private dwelling with a garden between the platforms. It was demolished shortly afterwards to allow the road to be straightened. Besides passenger traffic, the station provided for the transportation of cattle and sheep heading for market, the distribution of local milk and the delivery of newspapers to the community.

See also
1 and 2 Tai Cochion

References

Villages in Flintshire
Communities in Flintshire